Bishop Francis Kalist is the Archbishop of Pondicherry and Cuddalore. He served as Bishop of Roman Catholic Diocese of Meerut, India from 2009 till 19 March 2022.

Early life 

Kalist was born on 23 November 1957 in Reethapuram, Tamil Nadu, India.

Priesthood 
On 30 December 1982, Kalist was ordained a Catholic priest for the Roman Catholic Diocese of Meerut.

Episcopate 
Kalist was appointed bishop of the Roman Catholic Diocese of Meerut on 3 Dec 2008 and ordained a bishop on 8 Feb 2009 by Patrick Nair.
On 19 March 2022, Pope Francis appointed him as the Metropolitan Archbishop of Pondicherry and Cuddalore and he was installed on 29 April 2022. He received the pallium on 29 June 2022 from Pope Francis in St. Peter's Basilica, Vatican.

See also 
 List of Catholic bishops of India

References 

 
 

 

Living people
1957 births
21st-century Roman Catholic bishops in India
People from Kanyakumari district
Roman Catholic archbishops of Pondicherry and Cuddalore
21st-century Roman Catholic archbishops in India